Young Mayors and Independents, is a political youth organisation in the Czech Republic and is the official youth wing of the Mayors and Independents. It consists of young people who share liberal conservative values. It was founded in 2015. One of the most prominent members of the organisation is its current leader Tomáš Pavelka who was elected the youngest Mayor in the Czech Republic. The organisation had 90 members in 2018.  was very active prior 2021 Czech legislative election when it cooperated with Young Pirates during electoral campaign.

References

External links 
 Official homepage 

Politics of the Czech Republic
Youth politics
2015 establishments in the Czech Republic
Youth wings of political parties in the Czech Republic
Mayors and Independents